Victor Houet (born 2 September 1900, date of death unknown) was a Belgian footballer. He played in four matches for the Belgium national football team in 1924 and 1925.

References

External links
 

1900 births
Year of death missing
Belgian footballers
Belgium international footballers
Footballers from Liège
Association football forwards
R.F.C. Tilleur players